Furcantenna is a genus of hoverfly from southwestern China, Nepal and Peninsular Malaysia, containing three species. Furcantenna yangi is only known from males. Furcantenna is similar to the genus Schizoceratomyia. The two genera differ from each other in the shape of the scutellum; in Furcantenna a deep medial sulcus in its posterior margin divides the scutellum into two lobes.

Species
Furcantenna malayana Reemer, 2020
Furcantenna nepalensis Reemer, 2013
Furcantenna yangi Cheng, 2008

References

Hoverfly genera
Microdontinae
Diptera of Asia